The Eastern Missouri Conference is a high school athletic conference comprising small-size high schools located in eastern central Missouri. The conference members are located in Franklin, Gasconade, and Phelps counties.

Members

References

Missouri high school athletic conferences
High school sports conferences and leagues in the United States